This is the first edition of the tournament.
Radu Albot and Dušan Lajović won the title, defeating Robert Lindstedt and Jürgen Melzer in the final, 6–4, 7–6(7–2).

Seeds

Draw

Draw

References
 Main Draw

Istanbul Open - Doubles
2015 in Istanbul
2015 in Turkish tennis
2015 Doubles